Rozali bin Ismail is a Malaysian Malay businessman. He is the founder and the Executive Chairman of Puncak Niaga Holdings, as well as the Executive Chairman of Syarikat Bekalan Air Selangor (SYABAS); a water concession company taken over by the government of Selangor in 2017.

Rozali is also the president of the Malay Business Association of Selangor {DPMMS}.

Rozali bin Ismail previously held the positions of President of the Water Association of Selangor, Kuala Lumpur & Putrajaya; Deputy President of the Malaysian Water Association; and Selangor State Representative at Malay Chamber of Commerce.

Financials 
Bin Ismail was listed as one of the 40 richest men in Malaysia in 2011 with an estimated net worth of $155 million. According to Puncak Niaga Annual Report 2012, his total numeration fell within the RM33.3-RM33.4 million band during the financial year. His lucrative remuneration package has drawn public ire given the unsatisfactory level of water services in Selangor. His salary is a whooping RM 5.1 million a year.

Puncak Niaga 
Puncak Niaga was founded by Bin Ismail in the 1990s. The company orchestrated early water concession in Kuala Lumpur. Ismail's ties to Selangor politicians enabled him to facilitate public-private partnerships and influence the decision to employ a three-stage water treatment scheme in the region.

Puncak Niaga is the parent company of SYABAS. In October 2015 both companies were taken over by the Selangor state government.

In 2018 Syarikat Pengeluar Air Sungai Selangor (SPLASH) filed a suit against SYABAS, claiming RM 4.22 billion in outstanding receivables. According to the chairman of the Malaysian Chinese Association (MCA), Tan Gim Tuan, since the government took over, Syabas had reported massive annual losses every year. He further claimed that the suit could bankrupt the whole state.

Politics 
In the political scene, Rozali was the treasurer of United Malays National Organisation (UMNO) Selangor and UMNO Hulu Selangor Division.

Rozali is also the adviser for the Sultan Idris Shah Polytechnics.

Rozali bin Ismail is the Chairman of Gabungan Wawasan Generasi Felda (GWGF) – a group of 14 non-government organizations that speak for settlers and their families nationwide, estimated at some 600,000 people. In 2017 he called to disclose the identity of those responsible in the land ownership transfer, to reveal the identities of those involved in the suspicious RM200 million sale of Felda's land in Jalan Semarak. In 2018  bin Ismail announced that GWGF would continue to support the Barisan Nasional Party and the United Malays National Organization Government in Malaysia's 14th general election.

Awards and recognition
He was bestowed the Socrates Awards, a prestigious award given to successful businessmen around the globe who contributed their ideas and experiences to the international community. Rozali Ismail is also an activist in promoting the local economy, politics, education and Malaysian culture to the world.

Honour

Honour of Malaysia
  : Commander of the Order of Loyalty to the Crown of Malaysia (P.S.M.) (2000)

References

External links 
 YBhg. Tan Sri Rozali Ismail SYABAS

Living people
Date of birth missing (living people)
Malaysian businesspeople
People from Selangor
Commanders of the Order of Loyalty to the Crown of Malaysia
Year of birth missing (living people)